John Jefferson Bray,  (16 September 1912 – 26 June 1995) was an Australian lawyer, judge, academic, university administrator, Crown officer, and poet. From 1967 to 1978, he served as Chief Justice of the Supreme Court of South Australia.

Early life and parents
Bray was born in Adelaide, South Australia on 16 September 1912, the elder son of Harry Midwinter Bray (1879–1965), an Adelaide stockbroker, and his wife, Gertrude Eleanore Stow (members of whose family were Congregationalist missionaries in South Australia). His father's family had a history of involvement in South Australian politics and current affairs: Bray's grandfather was the Honourable Sir John Cox Bray, a former Premier of South Australia. On his mother's side, Bray claimed a collateral relationship to the third U.S. president, Thomas Jefferson.

Education
Bray was educated at the state school at Sevenhill in the Clare Valley; at St Peter's College, Adelaide; and at the University of Adelaide, where he earned a B.A. in 1932, an LL.B.(Hons.) in 1933 and an LL.D. in 1937.  He was granted an Honorary Doctorate in 1983.

Legal career
Bray trained as a lawyer and was admitted to the South Australian Bar in 1933, being appointed Queen's Counsel in 1957.

He was acting lecturer in jurisprudence at the University of Adelaide for the years 1941, 1943, 1945 (due to his being medically unfit to serve in World War II owing to extremely poor eyesight), and in 1951.

He served as a lecturer in Legal History at the University of Adelaide from 1957 to 1958, and then as a lecturer in Roman Law from 1959 until 1966. He was appointed Chief Justice of the Supreme Court of South Australia on 28 February 1967 and served until his retirement from the judiciary on 28 November 1978. Appointed by then Attorney-General of South Australia, Don Dunstan, he was appointed directly without having first served as a judge, which was an unusual occurrence.

Bray was appointed Chancellor of the University of Adelaide in 1968, and also served as Deputy to the Lieutenant-Governor of South Australia from 1968 until retirement.

Other activities
Bray was an active member of the Libraries Board of South Australia between 1944 and 1989, the longest-serving Libraries Board member until that point. After he retired, the State Library of South Australia named its reference section as the Bray Reference Library, a name given to a suite of rooms when the library was redeveloped in 2001.

He was vice-president of the South Australian branch of the Fellowship of Australian Writers, and was closely involved with the organisation of the first three Festival of Arts Writers' Weeks (1960, 1962, 1964), with his first volume of poetry launched at the second Writers' Week in 1962.

He was at the inaugural meeting of Friendly Street Poets, and remained an active member and contributor to the society's annual anthologies, the Friendly Street Reader. The Satura Prize is a poetry prize funded by a bequest from his estate and awarded by Friendly Streets.

Bray's first book of poetry was published in 1962.

Honours, recognition and legacy
Bray was made a Companion of the Order of Australia in 1979, and is said, by his younger brother, Dr Robert Stow Bray, to have refused a knighthood. He described his views as "æsthetic - traditional; social - emancipated; political - fluctuating" and his philosophies as "sceptical, some tendencies to Platonism".

The John Bray Poetry Award, awarded biennially since 1986 as part of the Adelaide Festival, was so named to honour his distinguished services to Australian poetry.

The John Jefferson Bray Memorial in Hurtle Square, Adelaide, was commissioned by the Adelaide City Council in 1994.

Bray died on 26 June 1995 in Adelaide.

There is a bronze bust of Bray, sculpted by local sculptor John Dowie, in the State Library.

Selected publications
Bray's publications reflected his interests, which he listed as "poetry, history, classics". As author, these included:

 Poems (Melbourne, Cheshire Press, 1962)
 Poems 1961-1971 (Brisbane, Jacaranda Press, 1972)
 Poems 1972-1979 (1979)
Bay of Salamis and other Poems (1986)
Satura: Selected Poetry and Prose (1988)
Seventy Seven (Adelaide, Wakefield Press, 1990)

He co-edited No. 7 Friendly Street Poetry Reader (1983) with Jan Owen.

He wrote two plays:
 Papinian (performed 1955)
 The Women of Troy (performed 1966)

He also made contributions to:
 Well and Truly Tried (1982), a festschrift for Sir Richard Eggleston
 Adelaide Law School Centenary Essays (1983)
 Australian Law Journal

See also

 Judiciary of Australia

References

Australian Who's Who (see also similar Australia, British, and international biographical publications),
Richard Carruthers-Żurowski,The Bray Family of England, Canada, and Australia(1986), deposited in the libraries of the Hampshire Family History Society and the South Australian Society for Genealogy and Heraldry.

Further reading

External links

1912 births
1995 deaths
John Jefferson
Chancellors of the University of Adelaide
Chief Justices of South Australia
Companions of the Order of Australia
People educated at St Peter's College, Adelaide
Lawyers from Adelaide
Adelaide Law School alumni
20th-century Australian poets
Australian male poets
20th-century Australian male writers
Judges of the Supreme Court of South Australia
20th-century Australian judges
Australian King's Counsel